The 2001 XFL Draft was the only draft for the first-iteration XFL football league. The draft took place over a three-day time period from October 28 to October 30, 2000, during which time a total of 475 players were selected by the league's 8 teams from a pool of approximately 1,600 or so eligible players. The draft consisted of 59 rounds—10 rounds taking place on October 28, 15 rounds on October 29, and 34 rounds on October 30.

The draft was followed by a supplemental draft on December 29, 2000, during which 65 additional players were selected in an effort to completely fill out team rosters. Most eligible players came from either the CFL, the Arena Football League, NFL Europe, retired NFL players, or previous college players who had gone undrafted by the NFL but had not yet signed with another league.

The XFL draft took place in order for teams to be ready to begin league play when the season kicked off on February 3, 2001.

Notable players drafted 

Many of the players selected in the XFL draft went on to compete in the NFL and other football leagues.

Notable players selected in the draft included Las Vegas running back Rod Smart, who first gained popularity because the name on the back of his jersey read "He Hate Me."  Smart stated that he had wanted to put "They Hate Me" (a jab at his critics) but there wasn't enough room.  Smart, who was only picked 357th in the draft, later went on to play for the Philadelphia Eagles, Carolina Panthers, and the Oakland Raiders, thus becoming the second XFL player (after receiver Yo Murphy did as a member of the St. Louis Rams in Super Bowl XXXVI) to play in a Super Bowl, participating in Super Bowl XXXVIII, which his team lost.

Many other XFL "alumni" who were selected in the draft went on to play in the NFL, including Kevin Kaesviharn, Jose Cortez, Corey Ivy, Mike Furrey and Rod Smart, and many others played extensively in the CFL, including Kelvin Anderson, John Avery, Duane Butler, Jeremaine Copeland, Marcus Crandell, Reggie Durden, Eric England, Paul McCallum (who wore the jersey nickname "CFL Reject"), Yo Murphy, Noel Prefontaine and Bobby Singh. The Arena Football League also absorbed some former XFL players.

Player selections

References

External links

Xfl Draft
Draft
American football drafts
Xfl Draft